is a horror-themed adventure game developed and published by Human Entertainment for the PlayStation in October 1997. An entry in the company's Twilight Syndrome series, the game was directed and co-written by Goichi Suda. Retaining the combination of adventure and visual novel elements from earlier games in the series, Moonlight Syndrome follows series protagonist Mika Kishii as she investigates supernatural phenomena.

Development of Moonlight Syndrome began following the completion of Suda's work on the first Twilight Syndrome games. Due to having little input on the original games' stories and disliking the ghost story elements, Suda focused the plot of Moonlight Syndrome around psychological horror and human capacity for evil. Critics liked the game's story but criticized the characters and long, inconsequential dialogue trees. Suda left Human Entertainment to form Grasshopper Manufacture following the release of Moonlight Syndrome, but the game remained an influence in his later work.

Gameplay
Similar to other titles in the Twilight Syndrome series, Moonlight Syndrome combines elements from adventure games and visual novels in its gameplay. The game contains both exploration in real-time environments and CGI story cutscenes,. The player controls multiple characters across ten different chapters, with the main aim being to explore environments from a side-scrolling perspective, interact with objects, and talk with characters to progress the narrative. During certain moments, the player can select different options for the character to perform, producing minor variations in subsequent events; these extend from the solving of puzzles to how characters respond to the player during conversations. Despite these choices, the game's story follows a linear path to the same ending.

Synopsis

Moonlight Syndrome takes place in a parallel reality to that of the main Twilight Syndrome series. Following the events of Twilight Syndrome: Search and Twilight Syndrome: Investigation, Mika Kishii (taking over the main protagonist role from Yukari Hasegawa in the previous games) is now a second-year student at Hinashiro High. She finds herself becoming aware of more and more unusual occurrences both at her school and the surrounding town of Hinashiro. Events are brought to the fore when Kyoko Kazan, a girl who looks strikingly similar to Mika, is killed in an accident. On her way home from school, Mika encounters a strange boy with white hair.

Ryo Kazan, the younger brother of Kyoko, is likewise seen coming to grips with the death of his sister. The two are implied to share incestuous feelings of love for one another, which leads to Ryo being confronted and tormented by Kyoko's boyfriend Sumio. Ryo visits the Lost Highway Nightclub, meeting Sumio's sister Rumi on the way. At the club, Ryo is lured by a mysterious girl named Yayoi to a room where he is confronted by her and Sumio. They present Ryo with a paper bag containing the head of Kyoko, the trauma of which combined with their words leads Ryo to awaken in a mental 'Edge of the World'. In this place, depicted as an infinite green field with a blue sky and singular tree in the centre, Ryo speaks with Rumi, Kyoko and Sumio, who now treat him more warmly and reminisce about their more peaceful past.

In the days that follow, Mika finds herself encountering several phenomena, such as the world freezing around her, the layout of her school changing, and strangers accosting her on the street. Several times, the white haired boy reappears before her and warns her about her future, however she forgets these meetings after they take place. She investigates mysteries with her third-year friends Yukari and Chisato (returning from the previous games) as well as new first-year student Arisa, while being pursued unsuccessfully by Ryo. Unlike in the Twilight Syndrome games, where each chapter's phenomena and threats are relatively standalone, every mystery here is linked to the white-haired boy and Yayoi (who is revealed to be the sister of Chisato), apparently working in conjunction.

Events culminate for Mika when she again encounters the white-haired boy who after breaks her spirit by allowing her to view the inner thoughts of the people around her. He guides her towards a light, with Ryo following in an attempt to save her, and the two disappear. 

Yukari, Chisato, Arisa, and several of Mika's classmates work to find her, but are ultimately all killed by the white haired boy or events triggered by him. Eventually, Ryo reappears in front of Mika's school. After being encouraged by Rumi to save her and being warned to turn back by Yayoi (both of whom appear more caring towards Mika and Ryo than they previously had), Ryo enters the school to face the white haired boy. While he is successful in defeating the boy, his last meeting with Mika is short-lived as she collapses dead in his arms after Ryo reunites with her.

In a post-credits scene, a catatonic Ryo is seen with a paper bag on his lap, while Mika's face appears on the television in front of him. 

Supplementary materials elaborate more on how several aspects of the game's story are derived from Zoroastrianism. The white haired boy was modeled after the Zoroastrian god of contract Mithra, and many of the game's unexplained and supernatural events (such as Kyoko's death) are explained to be the result of contracts made with Mithra by characters in the game (such as Sumio).

Development 

Moonlight Syndrome is an entry from the Twilight Syndrome series, and the first entry in the series to feature major input from Goichi Suda, who acted as writer and director. Suda had previously served as director of the first two Twilight Syndrome games when the original director had to step down due to scheduling conflicts, but he was unable to have much input. He wanted to create his own take on the series with Moonlight Syndrome, similar to how he had created an unconventional and notoriously dark ending to Super Fire Pro Wrestling Special in reaction to his restricted work on Super Fire Pro Wrestling III. The game began development following the release of the second Twilight Syndrome game. While the series focused on supernatural horror, Suda wanted to create something more frightening and apart the ghost story elements which genuinely scared him to the point he did not want to be involved with the series. This resulted in the story shifting away from paranormal elements and using psychological horror. The aim was to increase the frightening aspects of the game by making the violent incidents within the story random and caused by people rather than supernatural entities. 

The characters were designed by Takashi Miyamoto, who was picked by Suda based on his earlier work on another project. Suda's main wish with the characters was to take the cast of Twilight Syndrome and confront them with a clashing set of ideologies. Moonlight Syndrome also saw the introduction of voice acting to the series, as Suda wanted to express the story differently. For voiced segments, subtitles were omitted to heighten this sense of contrasting story-telling styles. When recording their lines, Suda remembered that the voice actors commented that they did not understand what was going on in the story. The music was composed by Masafumi Takada.

Due to his extensive creative control as compared to the original games, Suda was able to include several strange images, including the final scene featuring a severed head in a bag. During production, government restrictions around content in games and entertainment media were tightened due to the Kobe child murders and their resultant controversy. The new censorship rules forced Suda to tone down some of the more extreme imagery, especially since the main character murders others in a similar manner to the child murderer.

Reception

The game was released on 9 October 1997. One reviewer from Famitsu magazine noted that those expecting the "simple school horror" of earlier titles would be shocked by the game's story. Two other reviewers felt uncomfortable with how the characters were portrayed and believed the dialogue segments were lengthy and the CGI was poor in quality. In a 2016 retrospective, Den Faminico Gamer criticized the characters and the lack of branching scenarios, feeling the game was linear and the speech choices had no consequence. They did acknowledge the story was bizarre and recommended those interested simply watch a playthrough.

Legacy
Moonlight Syndrome was the last game Suda worked on at Human Entertainment before leaving. He was unsatisfied with his bonuses, and felt the company would soon be bankrupt. Following his departure, he formed his own company Grasshopper Manufacture. Their debut game, The Silver Case, was released in 1999. Suda directed, co-wrote and designed the game, while Miyamoto and Takada were brought back as character designer and composer. Suda also brought in Masahi Ooka as co-writer after being impressed with Ooka's work on a supplemental story created for a Moonlight Syndrome strategy guide. Grasshopper Manufacture has borrowed settings and characters from Moonlight Syndrome for The Silver Case and some of their other work including Flower, Sun, and Rain. 

Suda's use of strange and disturbing imagery within his storytelling would become a hallmark of his later work. The game's urban setting, which featured apartment complexes, would feature in other projects by Suda including Blood+: One Night Kiss and No More Heroes. Naoko Sato, scenario writer of the video game Siren, cited Moonlight Syndrome as one of the inspirations for the scenario and writing of Siren.

Notes

References

1997 video games
1990s horror video games
Adventure games
Alternate history video games
Human Entertainment games
Japan-exclusive video games
PlayStation (console) games
PlayStation (console)-only games
Single-player video games
Video games developed in Japan
Video games directed by Goichi Suda
Video games scored by Masafumi Takada